Seth Benardete (April 4, 1930 – November 14, 2001) was an American classicist and philosopher, long a member of the faculties of New York University and The New School. In addition to teaching positions at Harvard, Brandeis, St. John's College, Annapolis and NYU, Benardete was a fellow for the National Endowment for the Humanities and the Carl Friedrich von Siemens Stiftung in Munich.

Life and family
Benardete was born in Brooklyn into an academic family. His father, Maír José Benardete, was a professor of Spanish at Brooklyn College and expert on Sephardic culture. His older brother José Benardete was a noted philosopher. His younger brother Diego Benardete is a professor of mathematics at the University of Hartford. Seth was married to Jane, a professor of English at Hunter College in Manhattan; and they had two children, Ethan and Alexandra.

Career
At the University of Chicago in the 1950s he was a student of Leo Strauss, along with Allan Bloom, Stanley Rosen and several others who were to go on to illustrious academic careers. Philipp Fehl was one of his fellow students and a good friend. Benardete wrote his doctoral dissertation on Homer (recently reprinted as Achilles and Hector: The Homeric Hero by St. Augustine's Press). His publications range over the spectrum of classical texts and include works on Homer, Hesiod, Herodotus, the Attic tragedians, and most especially Plato and Aristotle. While his prose is considered by some to be dense and cryptic, as a teacher he regularly impressed his students with his tremendous erudition, which was certainly not limited to classical literature, and by his willingness to take seriously the opinions and thoughts of all his students. Many consider him to be one of America's greatest classical scholars: Harvey Mansfield and Pierre Vidal-Naquet are among those who have praised his achievements.

Benardete's method of reading is described by his posture as a reader, following Strauss, in this way: the great writers in a tradition are to be treated as powerful thinkers who have complete control over what they say, how and when they said it, and what they omit. The reader thus risks fundamentally misunderstanding the text of a great author if he dissects elements of the text in such a way that they appear capable of explanation through principles of psychology, anthropology, or other methods which assume that the critic has a greater depth of understanding of the text (or of the human condition) than the author. Further, each successive "great" writer in a tradition must be assumed to be fully aware and in control of the elements of the philosophical and artistic conversation that arises in the foundational texts. With this perspective Benardete was able to find threads of unity in authors whose works apparently lack cohesiveness (e.g., Herodotus). In the spirit of the continuing engagement of moderns with the classical authors, Benardete showed great respect for the various traditions of commentary (the Alexandrians, the Byzantine editors, and the German tradition of Altertumswissenschaft) in contrast to more recent trends in scholarship which sometimes tend to homogenize the thought of great writers into their cultures and to adduce bits of textual evidence to prove a point without due regard to the entirety of the text from which it is excerpted.

Among Benardete's most important works are Herodotean Inquiries (The Hague, 1969); The Being of the Beautiful: Plato’s Theaetetus, Sophist, and Statesman (Chicago, 1984); Socrates’ Second Sailing: On Plato’s Republic (Chicago, 1989); The Rhetoric and Morality of Philosophy: Plato’s Gorgias and Phaedrus (Chicago, 2009); The Tragedy and Comedy of Life: Plato’s Philebus (Chicago, 2009); The Bow and the Lyre: A Platonic Reading of the Odyssey (Lanham, MD, 1997); Plato’s Laws: The Discovery of Being (Chicago 2000); Plato’s Symposium (with Allan Bloom, Chicago 2001).

References

Harvey C. Mansfield, "Seth Benardete, 1930–2001", originally published in The Weekly Standard (November 27, 2001)

External links
The Benardete Archive – An ongoing project of bibliography, biography, recollections of his courses and appreciation of his contribution to classical scholarship.
Coming to the College, The University of Chicago 1948–52, 1954–55 – An excerpt from Encounters and Reflections: Conversations with Seth Benardete'' edited by Ronna Burger.
Review of Seth Benardete, Encounters & Reflections – Review and appreciation by a colleague at NYU.
Biography, Bibliography and Introduction to his work.

1930 births
2001 deaths
American people of Turkish-Jewish descent
American philologists
Hellenists
Jewish philosophers
New York University faculty
Political scientists who studied under Leo Strauss
20th-century philologists